Damodar Rawat is an Indian politician. He was elected to the Bihar Legislative Assembly from Jhajha constituency in Bihar in the 2010 Bihar Legislative Assembly election as a member of the Janata Dal (United).

References

Living people
Janata Dal (United) politicians
Samata Party politicians
People from Jamui district
Bihar MLAs 2010–2015
Year of birth missing (living people)
Bihar MLAs 2020–2025